This is a list of fermented soy products. A diverse variety of soy food products made from fermented soybeans exists.

Fermented soy products

See also

 List of fermented foods
 List of food pastes
 List of meat substitutes
 List of soy-based foods
 Sweet bean paste

References

 List
Soy, Fermented